This is a list of extinct and endangered species of Italy.

Symbols
EX = extinct
CR = critically endangered
EN = endangered
VU = vulnerable

Italian Animals
Slender-billed curlew (Numenius tenuirostris) (critically endangered)
Balearic shearwater (Puffinus mauretanicus) (critically endangered)
Sociable lapwing (Vanellus gregarius) (critically endangered)
Great bustard (Otis tarda) (vulnerable)
Italian wolf (Canis lupus italicus) (vulnerable)
Marsican brown bear (Ursus arctos marsicanus) (critically endangered)
Italian grey partridge (Perdix perdix italica) (critically endangered)
Spined dwarf mantis (Ameles fasciipennis) (extinct)
Sicilian wolf (Canis lupus cristaldii) (extinct)

E

Italy
Italy
Italy
.
Endangered biota of Europe